Albert Vivancos Roig (born 2 February 1994), commonly known as Vivi, is a Spanish footballer who plays for UE Olot as a central midfielder.

Club career
Born in Bescanó, Girona, Catalonia, Vivi graduated with Girona FC's youth setup, and made his debut with the reserves in the regional leagues. He previously had a trial at Queens Park Rangers FC, but the deal collapsed.

On 29 September 2013, Vivi played his first match as a professional, coming on as a late substitute in a 0–2 loss at Córdoba CF. On 20 October of the following year he was loaned to Segunda División B's CE L'Hospitalet.

On 18 August 2015, Vivi was definitely promoted to the main squad, also signing a new three-year deal with the Albirrojos. On 8 January of the following year, after being rarely used, he was loaned to Hércules CF until June.

On 30 August 2016, Vivi was loaned to UE Llagostera in a season-long deal. The following 24 July, he cut ties with Girona and joined UCAM Murcia CF just hours later.

References

External links

1994 births
Living people
People from Gironès
Sportspeople from the Province of Girona
Spanish footballers
Footballers from Catalonia
Association football midfielders
Segunda División players
Segunda División B players
Girona FC B players
Girona FC players
CE L'Hospitalet players
Hércules CF players
UE Costa Brava players
UCAM Murcia CF players
Salamanca CF UDS players
UE Olot players
Primera Federación players
Real Unión footballers